The 1941 German Supercup, known as the Herausforderungskampf (English: Challenge Match), was an unofficial edition of the German Supercup, a football match contested by the winners of the previous season's German football championship and Tschammerpokal competitions.

The match was played at the DSC-Stadion in Dresden, and contested by 1940 German football champions Schalke 04 and cup winners Dresdner SC. Dresden won the match 4–2 to claim the unofficial title.

Teams

Match

Details

See also
 1940 German football championship
 1940 Tschammerpokal

References

Unofficial 1941
Dresdner SC matches
FC Schalke 04 matches
1941 in German football cups